1977–78 was the 31st season of the North American senior amateur Western International Hockey League, the final round of which was won by the Kimberley Dynamiters.

Standings

 Spokane Flyers		56		39	16	 1				328	186		 79
 Cranbrook Royals	56		34	22	 0				292	238	 	 68
 Kimberley Dynamiters	56		33	23	 0				266	260		 66
 Trail Smoke Eaters	56		21	33	 2				239	297		 44
 Nelson Maple Leafs 	56		11	44	 1				208	352		 23

Playoffs

Semi finals

Best of 7

 Spokane Flyers defeated Trail Smoke Eaters 4 games to 0 (5-4 OT, 5-0, 5-0, 8-2)
 Kimberley Dynamiters defeated Cranbrook Royals 4 games to 2 (5-4 2OT, 7-4, 2-5, 2-1, 3-4 2OT, 4-1)

Final

In the "Best of 7" series final, the Kimberley Dynamiters defeated the Spokane Flyers 4 games to 2 (3-2, 4-6, 6-2, 5-3, 2-5, 6-3). The Kimberley Dynamiters advanced to the 1977-78 Western Canada Allan Cup Playoffs.

References 

https://news.google.com/newspapers?nid=1314&dat=19780316&id=w9kvAAAAIBAJ&sjid=4u0DAAAAIBAJ&pg=6059,129161

Western International Hockey League seasons
WIHL
WIHL